The 1982 San Marino motorcycle Grand Prix was the thirteenth race of the 1982 Grand Prix motorcycle racing season. It took place on 3–5 September 1982 at the Mugello Circuit.

Classification

500 cc

References

San Marino and Rimini Riviera motorcycle Grand Prix
San Marino
San Marino Motorcycle Grand Prix
San Marino Motorcycle Grand Prix